Albertus "Ab" Marinus Christiaan van Bemmel (2 August 1912 – 19 February 1986) was a Dutch boxer who competed in the 1936 Summer Olympics.

He was born and died in Rotterdam.

In 1936 he was eliminated in the first round of the heavyweight class after losing his fight to Anthony Stuart.

1912 births
1986 deaths
Heavyweight boxers
Olympic boxers of the Netherlands
Boxers at the 1936 Summer Olympics
Boxers from Rotterdam
Dutch male boxers